Melancholy thistle is a common name for several plants and may refer to:

Cirsium helenioides
Cirsium heterophyllum